In Japanese,  may refer to:

People
Emperor Sanjō (三条天皇; Sanjō-tennō), the 67th emperor of Japan
 , a Japanese kuge family

Fictional characters
Kairi Sanjō and Yukari Sanjō, fictional characters from the manga series Shugo Chara!
Reika Sanjō, fictional characters from the anime series Invincible Steel Man Daitarn 3
Yukito Sanjō, fictional character from the Bakuryu Sentai Abaranger

Places
 Sanjō, Niigata (三条市; Sanjō-shi), a city in Niigata Prefecture, Japan
 , one of numbered east-west streets in the ancient capital of Heian-kyō, present-day Kyoto
 , one of numbered east-west streets in the ancient capital of Heijō-kyō, present-day Nara
 Sanjō Station (disambiguation), train stations "山上" and "三条"

See also
Sanyo